The Palace of the Kings of Navarre of Olite or Royal Palace of Olite is a castle-palace in the town of Olite, in Navarre, Spain. It was one of the seats of the Court of the Kingdom of Navarre, since the reign of Charles III "the Noble" until its conquest by Castile (1512).

This monument was quite damaged (except the church) in 1813 by a fire caused by general Espoz y Mina during the Napoleonic French Invasion with the aim of that was not occupied by French troops. It was largely restored from 1937 in works that lasted for 30 years giving it back its original appearance. Nevertheless, miscellaneous architectural decoration of its interior, and the outside gardens, were lost.

History
The fortification is both castle and palace, although it was built more like a courtier building to fulfill a military function. Since the 13th-century the Castle of Olite was called as Palace of the King of Navarre.

On an ancient Roman fortification was built during the reign of Sancho VII of Navarre "the Strong" (13th century) and extended by his successors Theobald I and Theobald II, which the latter was is installed in the palace in 1269 and there he signed the consent letter for the wedding of Blanche of Artois with his brother Henry I of Navarre, who in turn, Henry I since 1271 used the palace as a temporary residence. This ancient area is known as the Old Palace.

At this time the Navarrese court was traveling, so it can not consider this palace as royal seat during that time, as the castle was occupied intermittently by kings according to their preferences. So it had the presence of King Charles II of Navarre in 1380, 1381 and 1384.

Then the palace was housing the Navarrese court from the 14th until 16th centuries, Since the annexation (integration) of the kingdom of Navarre for the Crown of Castile in 1512 began the decline of the castle and therefore its practically neglect and deterioration. At that time it was an official residence for the Viceroys of Navarre.

In 1813 Navarrese guerrilla fighter Espoz y Mina during the Napoleonic French Invasion burned the palace with the aim to French could not make forts in it, which almost brought in ruin. It is since 1937 when architects José and Javier Yarnoz Larrosa began the rehabilitation (except the non-damaged church) for the castle palace, giving it back its original appearance and see today. The restoration work was completed in 1967 and was paid by the Foral Government of Navarre.

Description
The Palace of the Kings of Navarre of Olite (castle palace of Olite) consists of three cores: the Old Palace, the New Palace and the church iglesia de Santa María la Real.

Old Palace

The Old Palace, built in the 13th century in gothic style, is structured around a rectangular courtyard around which all dependencies luenga. On the ground floor there were the stores and the chapel of St George, built before 1357. Also on the ground floor stood the royal court's Great Hall, the main gate to which is on the main façade. The Great Hall was topped by three towers. Today only two remain: the central one, above the main door, was removed in 1414. On the upper floor several chambers existed, including the "Cambra luenga" (Long chamber) and the adjacent "Cambra de doña Juana" (chamber of doña Juana).

With the development of the New Palace in the 14th century, the royal court moved out the Old Palace. Parts of the Old Palace were thereafter used as stables, kitchens, and other secondary dependencies. In 1584 the Marquis of Almazán restored the main façade of Old Palace, placing the coat of arms of Philip II of Spain in it. This coat of arms is still visible today, but very deteriorated. The Old Palace eventually entered into a state of disrepair, and was largely abandoned. Most of its internal structure fell to ruin, although its main façade and four towers survived. The building was restored in the 20th century, but the internal chambers had been lost beyond repair. The four remaining towers are known as Torre de San Jorge (tower of St George), Torre de la Prisión (Tower of the prison), Torre de la Cigueña or de la Atalaya (Tower of the crane); the fourth tower has no specific name.

Nowadays, the Old Palace is a Parador de Turismo hotel called "Principe de Viana" facing a square known as Plaza de los Teobaldos. Nothing remains of the original internal structure of the old palace, except for the walls and outer façade have a Gothic window somewhat deteriorated with two shields on top among the pinnacles of the window.

Iglesia de Santa María la Real
()
Gothic church inside the royal palace, built in 13th-century. It highlights its cover consists of five decorated pointed archivolts, like the tympanum which is represented an image of Saint Mary head of the temple. On both sides a group of blind arches with images representing the Apostles. In front of its main facade a beautiful cloister discovered of the same period.

Inside stands the 16th-century Renaissance reredos attributed to Pedro de Aponte, presided over by a Gothic sculpture of the Virgin.

Although the church is located between the Old Palace and the New Palace, was not Palatine temple, as the kings had their own chapel, known as Chapel of San Jorge.

This church closes its doors at 13:00 hours.

New Palace
New Palace, its cover opens to the square called Plaza de Carlos III el Noble. At the end of 14th-century the King of Navarre Charles III "the Noble" of the house of Évreux, performs expansion works at the Old Palace in order to give the court a stationary and stable residence. While first reforms consisted repair the building and open new spaces for new courtesans needs soon outgrew the castle, so it had to consider the construction of new buildings that could accommodate the royal court. If it add that his wife Elanor of Castile did not feel special predilection for the Old Palace considering it old and uncomfortable, motivated the construction of a new Palace-Castle of new plant.

Charles III married Eleanor of Castile in 1375 and had eight children; notes Blanche that would be Queen of Navarre between 1425 and 1442 and Prince of Viana's mother, this prince would die without leaving decency. Charles III is buried in the Cathedral of Pamplona with his wife who had died in 1415.

Between 1395 and 1400 several houses along the Old Palace were purchased in order to begin construction. Impulsed by Elanor of Castile Old Palace facilities were expanded from behind the iglesia de Santa María la Real.

But the important works of the palace are work of King Charles III. These began in 1406 and were commissioned to Saúl de Arnedo and in 1424 the works were almost completed except some minor stays.

Built with large stone walls, adopts a polygonal shape with incoming and outgoing somewhat untidy and numerous towers covered with slate roofs instead of the originals that were covered with lead roofs.

At the time the castle palace was considered the height of the most luxurious European courts. The interior decoration of which nothing remains except a small remainder was composed of plasterwork, tiled and azulejos, stained glasses and gilded coffered ceilings. The floors and walls were covered with tapestries.

In the works of this palace intervened many artists of various nationalities, example of Eclecticism prevailing in the courtly constructions of the time; French influence is evident in towers, windows and balconies, while the Hispanic transpires in adarves flown on dogs in degradation as well as coffered ceilings, tiles and plasterwork.

In addition had hanging gardens, some nearly 20 meters high, garden areas, orchards and a zoological park that included a lion (gift from king of Aragon Pedro IV the Ceremonious), a camel, parrots, hunting dogs, hawks, four African buffalos, a giraffe, squirrels etc.

The entrance to the palace is through Plaza de Carlos III el Noble. The cover consists of a semicircular arch leads into an inner square known as Patio de los Naranjos, because in this place the king had commanded orange plants and other fruit trees. Today the floor is paved but originally was a garden with trees and flowers of various species: lemon, orange, Alexandria's jasmine, mulberries etc.

From this place can observe the external structure of iglesia de Santa María la Real's apse and the start of the temple's tower.

The care of the gardens were many gardeners, although in the care of them also involved the kings themselves, more than anything else as entertainment. For watering gardens a complicated system of irrigation was performed using lead pipes it was made in 1409 by Juan D'Espernou and later in 1414 by John Nelbort of Bristol. As winter was cold, the trees were protected by awnings that were attached to the walls, in the manner of greenhouses.

Sala de las excavaciones
(Excavations's room), it was the palace's old guard body. In this room it has found a vaulted room whose function is unknown, and it was filled with materials from the Old Palace.

Sala de los Arcos
(Archs's room) also known as Bat's cave. this popular name came for its almost total absence of light and that is a large room whose only function is to support the weight of the Queen's garden located at the top. It is covered with large pointed arches.

Cuerpo principal or Gran Torre
(Main body or Great Tower) is the main body of the Castle, on the first floor is the apartments of King and Queen, on the second floor is the Exhibition Room, with the exhibition "Olite, throne of a Kingdom ". Continuing up the spiral staircase arrived at the Tower of Homage. A total of 133 steps.

Torre del Homenaje
(Tower of Homage) known as the Torre de la Vit (vit in French is snail, and is named for the spiral staircase that runs along its inside). 40 meters high, is the highest tower of the palace, this tower is the only concession of a military nature that can be found in the palace. Rectangular base, on the corners of its terrace are four small circular turrets that give a certain lightness to the sturdy walls of ashlar. On the main floor in addition to the main rooms of the king and queen, can find some minor rooms that were to be used by the ladies and the kings service.

Sala de la Reina
(Queen's room) This is the private rooms of Queen, featuring the chimney and stone benches located next to windows. It was decorated with wooden baseboards, tapestries, paintings and plasterwork of Morisco tradition. The floor was paved with glazed bricks, while the ceilings sported wood paneling with gold accents. The windows were closed with stained glass. Beside it a small room known as Queen's toilet. The floors were covered with carpets and tapestries.

Sala del Rey
(King's room) is a large room that served mainly as banquet facilities, also has another small room that was used as a resting place of the monarch. It has stone chimney and large Gothic windows with benches.

Cámara de los Yesos or Sala Mudéjar
(Plasters's chamber or Mudéjar room). This is the only space that preserves the original plasterwork decoration. There are ten panels made in plaster by Morisco masters, representing heraldic shields, stars, bows, Islamic geometric patterns and vegetal decoration. One motif that appears is the chestnut leaves of Charles III's badge. The room is usually closed to the public, only opened by arrangement, to avoid damaging the plasterwork that are in pretty bad condition. The panels, left to right are pictured below:

Galería del Rey or Galería Dorada
(Gallery's King or Golden gallery), is a gallery next to the King's chamber that overlooks the courtyard known as Patio de las Moreras. Composed of a wing with arches of Gothic tracery. These are two superimposed Gothic arches, the lower higher than the top. Divided into three vertical sections separated by diamond pillars, the two of the ends formed of five arches while the center is formed only four.

Galería de la Reina

(Queen's gallery) Located next to the Queen's chamber, it is a small garden for the exclusive use of the Queen. It lies within the typological known as hanging gardens since it is located several meters high. For the construction of these gardens it had to build a room known as the Arches to substantiate the gallery. The gallery is entirely rebuilt in a cloister way and is formed by high arches with Gothic tracery small ornaments at the top. This garden is one of the places sheltered from the wind, so it is the ideal place to build the Queen's garden.

Torre de Fenero
(Fenero's tower) Controlled the passage through the City gate of Fenero, so called because through this opened door in the Walls came hay carts. It is a simple vain formed by a pointed arch without any decoration.

Torre de la Atalaya, del Vigía or de la Joyosa Guarda

So named because since it was a watchman notice of any incident that may occur in the vicinity. It is a square tower on whose crenellated terrace rises other smaller circulated. On the same the were located the watchman; It is so small that there is only space for one man. Adjoining the tower found another smaller cylindrical. In this tower stands a window lintel with original Gothic tracery, and wants to represent the eternal bond, one of the symbols of Charles III the Noble.

so named because of its square structure looming three balconies, each facing a cardinal point. From these balconies kings could watch the shows that were held at the foot of the castle. Adjoining the tower has a small tower with a square base and higher.

Torre de los cuatro vientos o de las Tres Grandes Finestras
(The Four Winds's tower or the Big Three Finestras's tower) So named because of its square structure looming three balconies, each facing a cardinal point. From these balconies kings could watch the shows that were held at the foot of the castle. Adjoining the tower has a small tower with a square base and higher. Both towers located very close to each other, are in the most remote area of the castle, on its south side. In this place could find other garden as Jardín del Cenador that today has disappeared and according news had a small fountain.

Torre del Aljibe
(Cistern's tower) The sole purpose of this tower was to store water from the nearby Cidacos river was brought to supply the palace. Hollow on the inside, from here water to the palace and the royal gardens was provided. The distribution was carried through lead pipes that were embedded in the palace's walls. Water gardens was made by copper buckets. This complex irrigation system was conducted by Juan D'Espernou. At the foot of this tower was a deep moat (the liony), so named because it was the place where were the dangerous beasts that had the king.

Torre de las Tres Coronas or Ochavada

(The Three Crowns' tower or Octagonal tower) So named for its peculiar shape arranged in three heights, in descending order and octagonal. Its top could be used for raising pigeons.

From this place can see the Pozo de hielo (the ice well). The well is dug 8 meters deep in the floor. An eggshell-shaped cover protected the ice during the rest of the year. This well was made in 17th century, so it was added after the castle's construction. The conservation technique of the ice that was well known, made by layers of ice's separated by layers of straw. Since the well was located in a cold place, ice could be kept until the end of summer. The ice was often used for both culinary and pharmaceutical purposes.

Capilla de San Jorge
(St. George's chapel) From the Torre de las Tres Coronas, can see remains of the chapel of St. George. Here was the kings' private chapel. Built in late-14th century was started by Queen Eleanor of Castile. Of this rectangular building only the outer walls remain. On top of the chapel rose a second floor for Queen's stay, but the poor quality of construction, as it was done in masonry, has meant that it has not reached today. Under the chapel find a vaulted space, which is an old wine cellar. The winery is closed by a barrel vault and has niches in the walls.

Patio de la Morera
(Morera's courtyard) it is a square space in whose center stands a white mulberry tree, which according to a tradition was planted by King Charles III himself. Because of its age it is declared a Natural Monument of Navarre.

Patio de la Pajarera
(Aviary's courtyard) reserved space for birds that inhabited the castle. Located in an inner courtyard, it was only uncovered at the top, which was closed by a network that prevented them from escaping. From Galería del Rey can completely observe this courtyard. Highlights in the place a space built in plaster that served as a nesting place for birds and still preserved in fairly good condition.

Daily life
Among the celebrations should be recalled the jousting or tournaments held in 1439 during the days that lasted the celebrations of the Prince of Viana and German Princess Agnes of Cleves's wedding.

Bullfights are also performed, as well in 1387 King Charles II of Navarre "the Bad" organized a bullfight in which intervened three Muslim as toreros.

The Basque pelota was an important part in this palace's life, so there aware of the existence of a Basque pelota's corridor and a set of racket. A document of 1408 tells of repair work on the Fronton's roof, in time of King Charles III the Noble.

Also in this palace was held the wedding of John I, Count of Foix, and Joan, Heiress of Navarre.

In late-19th century passed through the castle Gustavo Adolfo Bécquer, and in view of the ruined castle he made the work "The Royal Castle of Olite (Notes of a journey to Navarre)". In his tour Bécquer gives a romantic and nostalgic view of the castle, with its bare rooms.

References

Sources
Mariano Carlos Solano y Gálvez, Marqués de Monsalud "El Palacio Real de Olite", Boletín de la Real Academia de la Historia, 49 (1906), pp. 435–447.

External links
Castillo palacio de Olite at CastillosNet
Palacio de Olite at Guiarte Navarra
Palacio Real de Olite at Navarra.es
Castillo-Palacio Real de Olite (unofficial site)
Fotos del Castillo de Olite (Navarra) at EuroResidentes

Castles in Navarre
Buildings and structures in Olite
Palaces in Navarre
Buildings and structures completed in the 13th century
13th-century Roman Catholic church buildings in Spain
Buildings and structures completed in 1424
Paradores
Gothic architecture in Navarre
Gothic palaces
Royal residences in Spain
Kingdom of Navarre
Bien de Interés Cultural landmarks in Navarre
Former gardens in Spain